Salyan, Solukhumbu  is a village development committee in Solukhumbu District in the Sagarmatha Zone of north-eastern Nepal. At the time of the 1991 Nepal census it had a population of 5307 people living in 1034 individual households. It has been merged into Necha Salyan Gaupalika.

Geography

References

External links
UN map of the municipalities of Solukhumbu District

Populated places in Solukhumbu District